Desperate Cargo is a 1941 American film directed by William Beaudine and based on the 1937 Argosy magazine serial Loot Below by Eustace Lane Adams. The film stars Ralph Byrd, Carol Hughes, Julie Duncan and Jack Mulhall.

Plot
On the Caribbean island of Puerto Nueva, a disparate group of individuals await a Boeing 314 Clipper, the Caribbean Clipper that will take them to Miami. Tony Bronson is the new purser for the flight who disrupts the robbery of New York journalist Jim Halsey at their hotel.

Halsey is a passenger on the same flight, flying to the U.S. to begin an assignment for his newspaper that will ultimately have him stationed in the Orient. Having some money left, Halsey arranges a double date for Tony with two entertainers in a sister act, Ann Howard and Peggy Morton. The women have learned that their show in New York has been canceled and are stranded in Puerto Nueva without the fare to leave. Ann tries to manipulate Tony into arranging free passage for them on the Clipper. Tony falls in love with Ann and Jim proposes to Peggy.

Among the other passengers are Madden, Ryan, Desser and Professor Carter, their ringleader and a former pilot who flew Clippers for the airline. Their plan is to hijack the aircraft in mid-air, rob the passengers and steal a shipment of $500,000 from the plane's safe. Carter will then land in a remote area of the Caribbean Sea, where the gang and their loot will be collected.

When they take over the aircraft by killing the navigator and copilot, Carter locks the passengers in their quarters and the crew in the cargo compartment. After landing, although the gang has the money stolen from their captives, the safe is locked and only Tony can open it. Ryan is ordered to force the purser to open the safe, but in a struggle for Ryan's gun, Tony shoots him and escapes, jumping from the aircraft. Swimming over to the cargo hold, he frees pilot Hank MacFarland and the rest of the crew, then returns to the cockpit where Carter threatens to burn the Clipper. Tony overpowers him, and holding the rest of the gang at gunpoint, he allows MacFarland to regain control of the aircraft. Jim and Tony are finally reunited with their sweethearts as the Clipper heads to Miami, where the police are waiting to apprehend the gang.

Cast

 Ralph Byrd as Tony Bronson
 Julie Duncan as Ann Howard
 Carol Hughes as Peggy Morton
 Jack Mulhall as Jim Halsey
 I. Stanford Jolley as "Professor" Carter
 Kenneth Harlan as Capt. Hank MacFarland
 Richard Clarke as Henchman Ryan
 Johnstone White as Madden, a valet/henchman
 Paul Bryar as Henchman Desser
 Thornton Edwards as Manuelo
 Don Forrest as Navigator Williams
 Loretta Russell as Mrs. Pettingill, a passenger
 Rick Vallin as Radioman Stevens
 Harry Depp as Crouse, a small passenger

Production

Principal photography for the film, with a working title of Dangerous Cargo, took place from mid to late May 1941. Although the film is set aboard a Boeing 314 Clipper, nearly all of the shots are interior views filmed on a soundstage.

Reception
In a modern-day review, writer Catherine Yronwode found many redeeming characteristics in the film, including the casting of a number of interesting actors, such as silent screen stars Kenneth Harlan as the airliner pilot and Jack Mulhall as the second male lead. She wrote: "All in all, this was a great little movie of its type. Sure, it could have been better – a shorter set-up and more tension in the final scenes, a staccato musical score to heighten the drama, a cuter and more compliant lead actress – but it is certainly worth a viewing."

References

Citations

Bibliography

 Brooks, Tim and Earle Marsh. The Complete Directory to Prime Time Network and Cable TV Shows 1946-Present. New York: Ballantine Books, 2003. .

External links
 
 
 

American aviation films
1940s English-language films
American black-and-white films
1941 romantic drama films
1941 crime drama films
Films based on short fiction
Films directed by William Beaudine
Producers Releasing Corporation films
American crime drama films
Films set in the Caribbean
American romantic drama films
1941 films
1940s American films